Anastasio Greciano (born 6 January 1952) is a Spanish former professional racing cyclist. He rode in five editions of the Tour de France.

References

External links
 

1952 births
Living people
Spanish male cyclists
Cyclists from the Community of Madrid
People from Cuenca del Guadarrama